The second season of Saltibum premiered on April 11, 2015 at 5:30 p.m. (BRT/AMT) on Rede Globo. Luciano Huck returned to present, alongside resident judge Eduardo Falcão. Hugo Parisi was replaced by Roberto Biagioni.

This season had two winners (one male and one female), as opposed to the single winner format used in previous season. Actress Priscila Fantin won the Women's final against singer Thaeme, while actor Rodrigo Simas beat dancer Jacaré in the Men's final.

Contestants

Scoring chart

Show details

Week 1
Round 1 – Men & Women (Day 1)
Aired: April 11, 2015
 Celebrity guest judge: Felipe Titto
Running order

Week 2
Round 1 – Men & Women (Day 2)
Aired: April 18, 2015
 Celebrity guest judge: Rômulo Neto
Running order

Week 3
Round 2 – Men
Aired: April 25, 2015
 Celebrity guest judge: José Loreto
Running order

Week 4
Round 2 – Women
Aired: May 2, 2015
 Celebrity guest judge: Louro José
Running order

Week 5
Round 3 – Men
Aired: May 9, 2015
 Celebrity guest judge: Fernanda Gentil
Running order

Week 6
Round 3 – Women
Aired: May 16, 2015
 Celebrity guest judge: Flávio Canto
Running order

Week 7
Round 4 – Men
Aired: May 23, 2015
 Celebrity guest judge: Marcos Pasquim
Running order

Dive-off

Week 8
Round 4 – Women
Aired: May 30, 2015
 Celebrity guest judge: Felipe Andreoli
Running order

Week 9
Round 5 – Women
Aired: June 13, 2015
 Celebrity guest judge:  Thiago Martins
Running order

Week 10
Round 5 – Men
Aired: June 20, 2015
 Celebrity guest judge:  Thiago Martins
Running order

Week 11: Final
Round 6 – Men & Women's final
Aired: June 27, 2015
 Celebrity guest judge: Luana Piovani
Running order

References

External links
 Saltibum on GShow.com

2015 Brazilian television seasons
Celebrity reality television series